Parliament Hill (colloquially known as The Hill, is an area of Crown land on the southern banks of the Ottawa River in downtown Ottawa, Ontario, Canada. Its Gothic revival suite of buildings, and their architectural elements of national symbolic importance, is the home of the Parliament of Canada. Parliament Hill attracts approximately three million visitors each year. Law enforcement on Parliament Hill and in the parliamentary precinct is the responsibility of the Parliamentary Protective Service (PPS).

Originally the site of a military base in the 18th and early 19th centuries, development of the area into a governmental precinct began in 1859, after Queen Victoria chose Ottawa as the capital of the Province of Canada. Following several extensions to the parliament and departmental buildings and a fire in 1916 that destroyed the Centre Block, Parliament Hill took on its present form with the completion of the Peace Tower in 1927. Since 2002, an extensive $3 billion renovation and rehabilitation project has been underway throughout all the precinct's buildings; work is not expected to be complete until after 2028.

History

Previous use of site
Parliament Hill is a limestone outcrop with a gently sloping top that was originally covered in a primeval forest of beech and hemlock. For hundreds of years, the hill served as a landmark on the Ottawa River for First Nations and, later, European traders, adventurers, and industrialists, to mark their journey to the interior of the continent. After Ottawa, then called Bytown, was founded, the builders of the Rideau Canal used the hill as a location for a military base, naming it Barrack Hill. A large fortress was planned for the site following the War of 1812 and the Upper Canada rebellion, but the threat of an American invasion subsided, and the project was scrapped.

Selection as a parliamentary precinct

In 1858, Queen Victoria selected Ottawa as the capital of the Province of Canada. Barrack Hill was chosen as the site for the new parliament buildings, given its prominence over both the town and the river, as well as the fact that it was already owned by the Crown. On 7 May 1859, the Department of Public Works issued a call for design proposals for the new parliament buildings to be erected on Barrack Hill, which was answered with 298 submitted drawings. The entries were narrowed down to 3, but the panel of judges could not decide on whose design came first or second. Governor General Sir Edmund Walker Head was approached to break the stalemate, and the winners were announced on 29 August 1859.

The Centre Block and departmental buildings were each awarded separately. The first was awarded to the team of Thomas Fuller and Chilion Jones with their Victorian High Gothic scheme of a formal, symmetrical front facing a quadrangle and a more rustic, picturesque back facing the escarpment overlooking the Ottawa River. The team of Thomas Stent and Augustus Laver won the prize for the second category, which included the East and West Blocks. These proposals were selected for their sophisticated use of Gothic architecture, which was thought to remind people of parliamentary democracy's history, would contradict the republican neoclassicism of the United States' capital, and would be suited to the rugged surroundings while also being stately. $300,000 was allocated for the main building and $120,000 for each of the departmental buildings.

Construction and early use

Ground was broken on 20 December 1859, and the first stones were laid on 16 April of the following year. Prince Albert Edward, Prince of Wales (later King ), laid the cornerstone of the Centre Block on 1 September. The construction of Parliament Hill became the largest project undertaken in North America to that date. Workers hit bedrock sooner than expected, necessitating blasting to complete the foundations, which the architects had altered to sit  deeper than originally planned. By early 1861, Public Works reported that over $1.4million had been spent on the venture, leading to the site being closed in September and the unfinished structures covered in tarpaulins until 1863, when construction resumed following a commission of inquiry.

The site was still incomplete when three of the British North American colonies (now the provinces of Ontario, Quebec, Nova Scotia, and New Brunswick) entered Confederation in 1867, with Ottawa remaining the capital of the new country. Within four years Manitoba, British Columbia, Prince Edward Island, and the North-West Territories (now Alberta, Saskatchewan, Yukon, Northwest Territories, and Nunavut) were added and, along with the associated bureaucracy, the first three required representation be added in parliament. Thus, the offices of parliament spread to buildings beyond Parliament Hill even at that early date.

The British military allocated a nine-pounder naval cannon to Ottawa's British army garrison in 1854. The newly-created government of the Dominion of Canada purchased the cannon in 1869 and fired it on Parliament Hill as the Noonday Gun, colloquially known as "Old Chum", for many years.

By 1876, the structures of Parliament Hill were finished, along with the surrounding fence and gates. The grounds were designed with the help of architects Thomas Scott and Calvert Vaux. Following the death of Queen Victoria in 1901, in late September, Prince George, Duke of Cornwall (later King George V)Queen Victoria's grandsondedicated the large statue that stands on the hill in the late Queen's honour.

Fire, incidents, and renovations

On 3 February 1916, a fire destroyed the Centre Block. Despite the ongoing war, Governor General Prince Arthur, Duke of Connaught re-laid the original cornerstone on 1 September 1916; exactly fifty-six years after his brother, the future King Edward VII, had first set it. Eleven years later, the rebuilt Centre Block was completed and a new freestanding bell tower was dedicated as the Peace Tower, in commemoration of the Canadians who had lost their lives during the First World War.

Thereafter, the Hill hosted several significant events in Canadian history, including the first visit of the reigning Canadian sovereignKing George VI, with his consort, Queen Elizabeth—to his parliament in 1939. A huge celebration on 8 May 1945, marked VE Day; and the first raising of the country's new national flag took place on 15 February 1965; The Queen revisited Parliament Hill on 17 April 1982, for the issuing of a royal proclamation of the enactment of the Constitution Act that year.

In April 1989, a Greyhound Lines bus with 11 passengers on board travelling to New York City from Montreal was hijacked by an armed man and driven onto the lawn in front of the Centre Block. A standoff with police ensued and lasted six hours; though three shots were fired, there were no injuries.

On 14 September 2001, 100,000 people gathered on the main lawn to honour the victims of the September 11 attacks on the United States that year. The Queen's Diamond Jubilee was commemorated with a specially tinted window in the Centre Block on 7 February 2012, one day after Accession Day.

On 22 October 2014, shooting incidents occurred around Parliament Hill. After fatally shooting a Canadian Army soldier stationed as a ceremonial guard at the National War Memorial, a gunman entered the Centre Block of the parliament buildings. There, the shooter engaged in a firefight with Kevin Vickers, the Sergeant-at-Arms of the House of Commons, and members of the Royal Canadian Mounted Police, which ended when he was killed by Vickers and RCMP Constable Curtis Barrett. Following the incidents, the Parliamentary Protective Service was created to integrate the House of Commons and Senate security forces with RCMP patrols of the grounds.

Since 2002, an extensive $3 billion renovation and rehabilitation project has been underway throughout all the precinct's buildings to bring the Parliament buildings to modern safety standards and to address their deteriorated state; work is not expected to be complete until after 2028. The West Block was completed in November 2018 before the House of Commons moved there, and renovations on the Senate of Canada Building concluded in 2019 to accommodate the Senate while the Centre Block and East Block undergo renovations. Work on the Sir John A. Macdonald Building was completed in 2015, and the Wellington Building was completed in 2016. An architectural competition is being held for designs pertaining to the city block south of Wellington Street, and a new building, the Visitors Welcome Centre, is being built.

Grounds and name

The  area, maintained by the National Capital Commission, is named by the Parliament of Canada Act as "Parliament Hill" and defined as resting between the Ottawa River on the north, the Rideau Canal and the Colonel By Valley on the east, Wellington Street on the south and a service road (Kent Street) near the Supreme Court on the west. The south front of the property is demarcated by a Victorian high gothic wrought iron fence. Named the Wellington Wall, its centre is on an axis with the Peace Tower to the north and the formal entrance to Parliament Hill: the Queen's Gates, forged by Ives & Co. of Montreal.

The main outdoor area of The Hill is the formal forecourt, formed by the arrangement of the parliament and departmental buildings on the site. This expanse is the site of major celebrations, demonstrations, and traditional shows such as the annual Canada Day celebrations and the changing of the guard. To the sides of the buildings, the grounds are dotted with statues, memorials, and, at the northwest corner, a structure called the Summer Pavilion, a gazebo which is a 1995 reconstruction of an earlier gazebo, Summer House, built for the Speaker of the House of Commons in 1877 by Thomas Seaton Scott and demolished in 1956. The gazebo now serves as the National Police Memorium. Beyond the edges of these landscaped areas, the escarpment remains in its natural state.

In 1976, the Parliament Buildings and the grounds of Parliament Hill were each designated as National Historic Sites of Canada, given their importance as the physical embodiment of the Canadian government and as the focal point of national celebrations.

The Parliament of Canada Act renders it illegal for anyone to name any other area or establishment within the National Capital Region as "Parliament Hill", as well as forbidding the production of merchandise with that name on it. Any violation of this law is punishable on summary conviction.
[
{
  "type": "ExternalData",
  "service": "geoshape",
  "ids": "Q3533602", 
  "properties": {
      "title": "Peace Tower"
         }
},
{
  "type": "ExternalData",
  "service": "geoshape",
  "ids": "Q5062237", 
  "properties": {
      "title": "Centre Block"
         }
},
{
  "type": "ExternalData",
  "service": "geoshape",
  "ids": "Q1125633", 
  "properties": {
      "title": "Library of Parliament"
         }
},
{
  "type": "ExternalData",
  "service": "geoshape",
  "ids": "Q5327883", 
  "properties": {
      "title": "East Block"
         }
},
{
  "type": "ExternalData",
  "service": "geoshape",
  "ids": "Q7984482", 
  "properties": {
      "title": "West Block"
         }
},
{
  "type": "ExternalData",
  "service": "geoshape",
  "ids": "Q2091081", 
  "properties": {
      "title": "National War Memorial"
         }
},
{
  "type": "ExternalData",
  "service": "geoshape",
  "ids": "Q5061687", 
  "properties": {
      "title": "Central Post Office"
         }
},
{
  "type": "ExternalData",
  "service": "geoshape",
  "ids": "Q24559", 
  "properties": {
      "title": "Office of the Prime Minister and Privy Council"
         }
},
{
  "type": "ExternalData",
  "service": "geoshape",
  "ids": "Q7926617", 
  "properties": {
      "title": "Victoria Building"
         }
},
{
  "type": "ExternalData",
  "service": "geoshape",
  "ids": "Q4549747", 
  "properties": {
      "title": "Sir John A. Macdonald Building"
         }
},
{
  "type": "ExternalData",
  "service": "geoshape",
  "ids": "Q6975038", 
  "properties": {
      "title": "National Press Building"
         }
},
{
  "type": "ExternalData",
  "service": "geoshape",
  "ids": "Q7981337", 
  "properties": {
      "title": "Wellington Building"
         }
},
{
  "type": "ExternalData",
  "service": "geoshape",
  "ids": "Q4856072", 
  "properties": {
      "title": "Bank of Canada"
         }
},
{
  "type": "ExternalData",
  "service": "geoshape",
  "ids": "Q5159777", 
  "properties": {
      "title": "Confederation Building"
         }
},
{
  "type": "ExternalData",
  "service": "geoshape",
  "ids": "Q6316889", 
  "properties": {
      "title": "Justice Building"
         }
},
{
  "type": "ExternalData",
  "service": "geoshape",
  "ids": "Q6587151", 
  "properties": {
      "title": "St. Andrew's Presbyterian Church"
         }
},
{
  "type": "ExternalData",
  "service": "geoshape",
  "ids": "Q5329745", 
  "properties": {
      "title": "East and West Memorial Buildings"
         }
},
{
  "type": "ExternalData",
  "service": "geoshape",
  "ids": "Q913250", 
  "properties": {
      "title": "Library and Archives Canada"
         }
},
{
  "type": "ExternalData",
  "service": "geoshape",
  "ids": "Q196615", 
  "properties": {
      "title": "Supreme Court of Canada"
         }
},
{
  "type": "Feature",
  "geometry": { "type": "Point", "coordinates": [-75.6988, 45.4237] },
  "properties": {
    "title": "Centennial Flame",
    "marker-size": "medium",
    "marker-symbol": "monument"
  }
}
]

Parliament Buildings

The Parliament Buildings are three edifices arranged around three sides of Parliament Hill's central lawn, the use and administration of the spaces within each building overseen by the speakers of each chamber of the legislature. The Centre Block has the Senate and Commons chambers, and is fronted by the Peace Tower on the south facade, with the Library of Parliament at the building's rear. The East Block contains ministers' and senators' offices, as well as meeting rooms and other administrative spaces. The West Block is serving as the temporary seat of the House of Commons. The buildings' unifying architecture style is Gothic Revival.

Monuments and statues
More than 20 bronze statues are on the grounds, commemorating important figures in the country's history. Most are arranged in the gardens behind the three parliamentary buildings, with one outside of the main fence.

A number of other monuments are distributed across the hill, marking historical moments or acting as memorials for larger groups of people.

Surrounding area

Though Parliament Hill remains the heart of the parliamentary precinct, expansion beyond the bounded area described above began in the 1880s, with the construction of the Langevin Block across Wellington Street. After land to the east, across the canal, was purchased by private interests (to build the Château Laurier hotel), growth of the parliamentary infrastructure moved westward along Wellington, with the erection in the 1930s of the Confederation and Justice Buildings on the north side, and then further construction to the south. By the 1970s, the Crown began purchasing other structures or leasing space deeper within the downtown civic area of Ottawa. In 1973, the Crown expropriated the entire block between Wellington and Sparks Streets intending to construct a south block for Parliament Hill, but the government dropped this proposal and instead constructed more office space in Hull, Quebec. In 2021, this idea was revisited, with the Ministry of Public Services announcing a building contest for the block.

See also

 Parliament Hill cat colony
 Government Hill
 Capitol Hill
 Parliament Hill, London
 Parliamentary Triangle, Canberra

Notes

References

Citations

Sources

Further reading

External links

 Parliament Hill Website
 Canada by Design: Parliament Hill, Ottawa at Library and Archives Canada
 M.H. Stoneworks Inc.—Images of the restoration of various buildings on Parliament Hill
 Terry Guernsey fonds at the National Gallery of Canada, Ottawa, Ontario

 
Buildings and structures completed in 1927
Gothic Revival architecture in Ottawa
Hills of Canada
Legislative buildings in Canada
National Historic Sites in Ontario
Tourist attractions in Ottawa
1916 fires in North America
Fires in Canada